Route 530 is a  long north-east looping secondary highway in the southeast portion of New Brunswick, Canada.

The route's northern terminus is at Route 134 in the community of Cocagne. The road travels southeast around a portion of Cocagne Bay to the community of Saint-Marcel. The road then makes a sharp northeast turn before heading almost due north through the community of Cocagne Cove. Route 530 continues through the community of Cocagne Cape, makes a U-turn, and continues south along the Northumberland Strait. The road passes through the communities of Caissie Cape, Bourgeois, and Grande-Digue before ending at Route 134 in the local service district of Shediac Bridge-Shediac River.

History

See also

References

530
530